The Andean mouse (Andinomys edax) is a species of rodent in the family Cricetidae.  It is the only species in the genus Andinomys.
It is found in Argentina, Bolivia, Chile, and Peru.

References

Musser, G. G. and M. D. Carleton. 2005. Superfamily Muroidea. pp. 894–1531 in Mammal Species of the World a Taxonomic and Geographic Reference. D. E. Wilson and D. M. Reeder eds. Johns Hopkins University Press, Baltimore.

Mammals of Argentina
Mammals of Bolivia
Mammals of Chile
Mammals of Peru
Phyllotini
Mammals described in 1902
Taxa named by Oldfield Thomas
Taxonomy articles created by Polbot